Counting Hallways To The Left is Embrace The End's first full-length album.  It was released on June 28, 2005 on the independent label Abacus Recordings.  It was also released on colored vinyl by Man Alive.

Track listing
All tracks by Embrace the End

"It Ate Everybody" – 0:27
"Biography of a Fever" – 5:46
"Carbombs and Conversations" – 4:21
"Headlines and Deathtolls" – 1:37
"Memento Mori" – 5:50
"The Devil Rides a Pale Horse" – 0:55
"Frankie is a Cutter" (featuring guest vocals by vocalist Leo Miller and drummer Navene Koperweis of Animosity) – 1:55
"Tempest, Tried, and Tortured (The Bloodening)" – 6:52
"After Me The Floods" – 5:13
"The Father's Right Hand (My Lai)" – 5:34

Credits
Jesse Alford – vocals
Pat Piccolo – vocals
Joel Adams – guitar
Kyle Dixon – guitar
Ryan Lewis – bass
Bart Mullis – drums

Trivia
The song "After Me The Floods" was originally released on Embrace The End's demo tape as "Apres Moi le Deluge" which is the same title in French.
The song "Frankie is a Cutter" features guest vocals from Leo Miller and Navene Koperweis, the singer and drummer of Animosity.

References

Counting Hallways To The Left
Counting Hallways To The Left